Xam'd: Lost Memories is an anime series adapted from a concept created by the animation studio Bones. Directed by Masayuki Miyaji, the series follows Akiyuki Takehara, a high school student, who becomes involved in a terrorist attack and is given the power to transform into a creature known as a Xam'd, along with his interactions with Haru Nishimura, Akiyuki's friend who attempts to rendezvous with him, and Nakiami, a mysterious girl who helps Akiyuki to control the Xam'd power inside of him.

The anime series was first announced to be exclusively released on the PlayStation Network on July 17, 2008 at the E3 video game trade show, and lasted twenty-six episodes. The episodes began to be released weekly in America on July 18, 2008 in English subtitles. The first twelve episodes later began to be released in Japan starting on September 24, 2008, with two episodes becoming available each week.

On June 24, 2010, Sentai Filmworks announced that it had sub-licensed the series for home video distribution across North America, and the first half season was released on DVD and Blu-ray Disc on September 21, 2010. The second set was released on November 9, 2010 on DVD and Blu-ray.  The English dub is available for streaming on the Anime Network as of September 16, 2010.

Episode list

References

External links 
  

Xam'd: Lost Memories